National Peasant Party may refer to:

National Peasant Party (Hungary)
National Peasants' Party, a political party in Romania